Fritz Erler (14 July 1913 – 22 February 1967) was a German politician representing the Social Democratic Party (SPD). From 1953 to 1957, he was Deputy Chairman of the Defense Committee of the Bundestag, the West German parliament. In this role, Erler played an important role in drafting the legislation that ensured democratic control of the Bundeswehr, West Germany's new armed forces.

Erler became a member of the Socialist Worker Youth in 1928, and in 1931 he joined the SPD. Erler served as a municipal official until the Nazis arrested him in 1938, and imprisoned him on treason charges. After the end of the Second World War, Erler became involved in politics on the state level before being elected to the Bundstag at 1949, when he was 36 years old. Erler thereafter became an expert on defense policy within the SPD. He was deputy chair of the defense committee in the Bundstag from 1953 to 1957.

Erler was elected, without opposition, as one of two deputy chairman of the SPD in 1964 at the special party congress in Bad Godesberg. At the same Congress, Herbert Wehner was elected deputy chairman, and Willy Brandt was elected party chairman. Erler served as deputy chairman until his death.

Erler died at his home in Pforzheim in southern Germany on 22 February 1967, at age 53. His daughter, Gisela Erler, would become a left-wing feminist publisher, entrepreneur, and, from 2011 to 2021, a member of the state government of Baden-Württemberg.

References

1913 births
1967 deaths
Members of the Bundestag for Baden-Württemberg
Members of the Bundestag 1965–1969
Members of the Bundestag 1961–1965
Members of the Bundestag 1957–1961
Members of the Bundestag 1953–1957
Members of the Bundestag 1949–1953
People from Pforzheim
Members of the Bundestag for the Social Democratic Party of Germany